Oliver Wendell Jones is a fictional character in Bloom County, Outland and Opus, three comic strips by American cartoonist Berkeley Breathed. The character was named for 
United States Supreme Court Justice Oliver Wendell Holmes, Jr.

Fictional character biography
Oliver is an elementary-school age child with an incredibly advanced knowledge of science, math, technology, and computers. He is a strict rationalist and an atheist, although his understanding of the complex nature of the universe drives him to consider (once per year, on a strict schedule) the possibility of an intelligence behind its creation. His father, Frank Jones, was a regular character in the series, while his mother, while present, appeared far less and usually only in direct reaction to Oliver's storylines. The Jones family represented the only African-American family in the strip, a fact that was often referenced directly as a point of humor or satire.

The genius of the group, he frequently use his intelligence for political activism that borders on the illegal, such as hacking and dangerous scientific experiments. His father Frank frequently punishes him for his criminal activities, albeit begrudgingly, particularly when some of Oliver's schemes profit Frank personally.

First appearance
Oliver first appeared in a Bloom County's daily strip on September 26, 1983, dragging a desktop computer in a wagon. Over the course of strips on the following four days, he used his Banana Jr. 6000 computer to alter the front page of the New York Times from "Reagan Calls Women 'America's Most Valuable Resource'" to "Reagan Calls Women 'America's Li'l Dumplin's'", sparking nationwide outrage (the comment was based on a real comment made by Hayden Fry, the football coach for the University of Iowa). He similarly hacked into the headquarters of Russia's state-owned newspaper and attempted to change the headlines to "Gorbachev Urges Disarmament! Complete! Total!" (though due to a mistranslation, the headlines actually read "Gorbachev Sings Tractors! Turnips! Buttocks!"). He also breached computers at the National Strategic Defense Center (a reference to NORAD), AT&T's telephone customer account file, and the IRS in order to give his father a multi-million dollar tax refund.

Among his other accomplishments is building an atomic bomb for a school science project using radioactive material scraped from luminescent clocks, a feat that got him suspended from school. He also hijacked HBO's transmissions claiming to be leader of the "People's Revolutionary Anti Scrambling Front for the Liberation of Public Airwaves etc, etc." in a stunt reminiscent of Captain Midnight's similar hijacking of HBO.

Parents
Oliver's parents are Frank and Eleanor Jones, named for Franklin D. Roosevelt and Eleanor Roosevelt. Frank is resigned to having a "weird" son and often deliberately ignores Oliver's activities because he realizes he would not understand the explanation even if Oliver gave one (Frank has also stated that if he ever did understand the explanation, he would have report his son to the authorities). At times Oliver uses his father as an unwitting guinea pig for his experiments or outright bribes him to look the other way; Frank usually recovers from these misadventures to punish Oliver with a spanking or by temporarily taking away his computer.

On the other hand, Eleanor is deeply distressed by her son's behavior, though mostly from the point of view that he should seek out friends or typical hobbies (such as football) rather than lock himself away with his computer and experiments. She also encourages him to look for more mainstream role models, at one point attempting to dress him as Michael Jackson. Oliver takes pains to conceal his exploits from his mother for fear of upsetting her. Frank likewise tries to keep the truth from his wife, though this is often because he himself is complicit in encouraging Oliver's illegal schemes.

Inventions

The Electro-Photo Pigment-izer
In an attempt to destroy the South African apartheid regime, Oliver invented a camera whose flash turned the victim's skin color darker, with the intention of using it on the white South African ambassador in order to cause political chaos. The plan was thwarted when Cutter John, who had volunteered to be airdropped into the South African embassy with the use of helium balloons attached to his wheelchair, was blown off course and ended up in Russia.

The Teleportation Device
This was an attempt to transport matter. A few bugs plagued it in the beginning: Oliver's first attempt at teleportation landed him part way in the floor. Another attempt resulted in his father's Jaguar XJS being transported into orbit around Pluto. The largest disaster was due to Bill The Cat's presence in the transporter with Oliver, which changed Oliver into half-human half-cat, a la The Fly. This was later revealed to be a dream.

Scalp Tonic
In the course of attempting to create a deodorant from Bill the Cat's sweat, the resulting solution was discovered to cure baldness, launching a  hair-tonic business for the Jones family until the government declared the tonic a controlled substance. Subsequently, the price of the tonic skyrocketed, and the Bloom County gang soon found themselves running a lucrative underground hair-tonic cartel, only to have it collapse when the government later decriminalized the tonic.

The Grand Unification Theory
Oliver began an escalating rivalry with Stephen Hawking after learning that they were both seeking an equation that explained the universe.
Oliver wrote a letter to Hawking, ridiculing his mathematical abilities; Hawking responded by mailing Oliver a thermonuclear bomb. Oliver eventually beat Hawking to the equation and attempted to explain it to Opus. Under closer examination, the equation disproved the existence of flightless waterfowl, inadvertently erasing Opus from existence. Checking his sums, Oliver discovered that he "forgot to carry the two" and corrected the equation, which restored Opus but rendered the equation useless.

References

Bloom County characters
Comics characters introduced in 1983
Fictional African-American people
Fictional hackers
Fictional American people
Fictional inventors
American comics characters